Tu B'Av is a minor Jewish holiday. In modern-day Israel, it is celebrated as a holiday of love. It has been said to be an auspicious day for weddings.

Historical significance
According to the Mishna, Tu B'Av was a joyous holiday in the days of the Temple in Jerusalem, marking the beginning of the grape harvest. On Yom Kippur and Tu B'Av, the unmarried girls of Jerusalem dressed in white garments and went out to dance in the vineyards. The Talmud states that there were no holy days as happy for the Jews as Tu B'Av and Yom Kippur. The holiday celebrated the wood-offering brought in the Temple (see Nehemiah 13:31). Josephus refers to it as the Feast of Xylophory ("Wood-bearing").

Various reasons for celebrating on Tu B'Av are cited by the Talmud and Talmudic commentators:
 While the Israelites wandered in the desert for forty years, female orphans without brothers could only marry within their tribe to prevent their father's inherited territory in the Land of Israel from passing on to other tribes, following the incident of the Daughters of Zelophehad. After the conquest and division of Canaan under Joshua, this ban was lifted on the fifteenth of Av and inter-tribal marriage was allowed.
 At the end of Israel's wandering in the wilderness, the last remnant of the generation of the sin of the spies, which had been forbidden from entering the Promised Land, found that they were not destined to die. For forty years, every Tisha B'av the Israelites made graves for themselves in which they slept expecting to be their last night; every year a proportion of them died. In the 40th year, the fifteen thousand who had remained from the first generation went to sleep in the graves and woke up the next day to their surprise. Thinking they made a mistake with the date, they kept sleeping in graves until they reached Tu B'Av and saw a full moon. Only then did they know they were going to enter the Land of Israel with the new generation.
The Tribe of Benjamin was allowed to intermarry with the other tribes after the incident of the Concubine of Gibeah (see Judges chapters 19–21).
Cutting of the wood for the main altar in the Temple was completed for the year.
King Hoshea of the northern kingdom removed the sentries on the road leading to Jerusalem, allowing the ten tribes to once again have access to the Temple.
The nights, traditionally the ideal time for Torah study, are lengthened again after the summer solstice, permitting more study.
The Roman occupiers permitted burial of the victims of the massacre at Bethar during the Bar Kochba rebellion. Miraculously, the bodies had not decomposed, despite exposure to the elements for over a year.

Modern times
Tu B'Av is a day of joy that follows Tisha B'Av by six days and contrasts with the sadness of Tisha B'Av. Tu B'Av does not have many established religious rituals associated with its celebration except that Tachanun is not said—either at mincha the day before or on the day itself—and a bride and groom traditionally do not fast if their wedding falls on Tu  B'Av. These customs commemorate the happy events that occurred in the history of the Jewish People.

In modern times, it has become a romantic Jewish holiday among secular Jews who mostly see it as the Jewish equivalent of Valentine's day and comparable to Sadie Hawkins Day. After experiencing a surge in popularity in the modern state of Israel, Israelis prefer to celebrate love on Tu B'Av and North American Jewish organizations throw celebrations and offer teachings on Tu B'Av. It serves as a day for matchmaking, weddings, and proposing, but also for increasing Torah study. Tu B'Av is more popular than Valentine's Day since secular Jews and Haredi celebrate Tu B'Av while Haredi are less likely to be aware of Valentine's Day.

There is an initiative calling for Tu B'Av Together, for a global day of prayer, praying for Shidduchim (opportunities to meet a potential spouse) but importantly praying for a fellow Jew to find the perfect spouse. The initiative brings together Jews every year in prayer, saying Tehillim (Psalms) for each other to find a spouse. 8 Chapters of Tehillim (Psalms) are recited in unison around the world simultaneously and across different time zones.

References

Av observances
Days celebrating love
Av
Hebrew names of Jewish holy days
Minor Jewish holidays

nn:15. ab